During the 2003–04 English football season, Leicester City competed in the FA Premier League.

Season summary
Micky Adams had guided Leicester back to the Premiership at the first attempt, despite the club spending part of their Division One campaign in receivership before a takeover safeguarded their future. But he was unable to keep them there, and their relegation was confirmed at the beginning of May. A 4–0 thumping of fellow relegation rivals Leeds United in September appeared to have set the tone for the rest of the season but it was soon followed by a setback of five straight defeats despite promising displays. A run of three wins in five games in November kept Leicester in close contention of survival, with the 2–0 victory at Portsmouth seeing them rise to as high as 12th; however, it all went wrong as, after a creditable 1–1 draw with eventual champions Arsenal, the team went into freefall and endured a dreadful run of only one win in 22 games (though most scorelines were reasonably close and they dropped too many points from 12 games they drew which they could have won). Ultimately, Leicester were relegated in a 2–2 draw at Charlton Athletic, which left them eight points adrift of Manchester City with two games remaining. It was a traumatic end to a season which had seen the club plagued with crises on and off the field, including the La Manga controversy when players Keith Gillespie, Frank Sinclair and Paul Dickov were accused of sexual assault following an alleged incident at a hotel in Spain (all charges were finally dropped).

Final league table

Results summary

Results by round

Results
Leicester City's score comes first

Legend

FA Premier League

FA Cup

League Cup

Squad
Squad at end of season

Left club during the season

Reserve squad

Statistics

Appearances and goals
As of end of season

|-
! colspan=14 style=background:#dcdcdc; text-align:center| Goalkeepers

|-
! colspan=14 style=background:#dcdcdc; text-align:center| Defenders

|-
! colspan=14 style=background:#dcdcdc; text-align:center| Midfielders

|-
! colspan=14 style=background:#dcdcdc; text-align:center| Forwards

|-
! colspan=14 style=background:#dcdcdc; text-align:center| Players transferred or loaned out during the season

|-

Transfers

In
 Steve Howey – Manchester City, 5 June, undisclosed
 Riccardo Scimeca – Nottingham Forest, 24 June, free
 Paul Brooker – Brighton and Hove Albion, 24 June, free
 Danny Coyne – Grimsby Town, 3 July, free
 Keith Gillespie – Blackburn Rovers, 8 July, free
 Lilian Nalis – Chievo, 11 July, free
 Les Ferdinand – West Ham United, 11 July, free
 Ben Thatcher – Tottenham Hotspur, 17 July, £300,000
 Craig Hignett – Blackburn Rovers, 18 July, free
 Steve Guppy – Celtic, 13 January, free
 Peter Canero – Kilmarnock, 2 February, £250,000
 Lee Morris – Derby County, 2 February, nominal fee
 Nicolas Priet – Lyon, free

Out
 Tim Flowers – retired, 7 May
 Martin Reeves – released, 7 May (later joined Northampton Town on 9 June)
 Simon Royce – released, 7 May (later joined Charlton Athletic on 26 June)
 Stefan Oakes – released, 7 May (later joined Walsall on 3 July
 Nicky Summerbee – released, 7 May (later joined Bradford City on 4 September)
 Jon Ashton – released, 7 May (later joined Oxford United on 8 September)
 Matt Jones – released, 7 May (later retired on 4 June 2004)
 Michael Price – released, 7 May
 Darren Eadie – released, 7 May
 Jon Stevenson – released, 7 May (later joined Swindon Town)
 Brian Deane – West Ham United, 31 October, free
 Steve Howey – Bolton Wanderers, 29 January, undisclosed
 John Curtis – Portsmouth, 2 February, free
 Gerry Taggart – Stoke City, 26 February, free

Loan in
 Marcus Bent – Ipswich Town, 1 September, season-long loan
 Nikos Dabizas – Newcastle United, 1 January, six-month loan
 Steffen Freund – Kaiserlautern, 30 January, season-long loan

Loan out
 Tommy Wright – Brentford, 12 September
 Gerry Taggart – Stoke City, 9 December, two months

Awards

Club awards
At the end of the season, Leicester's annual award ceremony, including categories voted for by the players and backroom staff, the supporters and the supporters club, saw the following players recognised for their achievements for the club throughout the 2003–04 season.

References

Leicester City F.C. seasons
Leicester City